Washington's 46th legislative district is one of forty-nine districts in Washington state for representation in the state legislature. It includes the North Seattle neighborhoods east of Aurora Avenue except for the University District, as well as the cities of Lake Forest Park and Kenmore.

The district's legislators are state senator Javier Valdez and state representatives Gerry Pollet (position 1) and Darya Farivar (position 2), all Democrats.

See also
Washington Redistricting Commission
Washington State Legislature
Washington State Senate
Washington House of Representatives

References

External links
Washington State Redistricting Commission
Washington House of Representatives
Map of Legislative Districts

46